194 (one hundred [and] ninety-four) is the natural number following 193 and preceding 195.

In mathematics
 194 is the smallest Markov number that is neither a Fibonacci number nor a Pell number
 194 is the smallest number written as the sum of three squares in five ways
 194 is the number of irreducible representations of the Monster group
 194!! - 1 is prime

See also
 194 (disambiguation)

References

Integers